Tetyana Serhiivna Arefyeva is a Ukrainian former tennis player. In her career, she won two singles and two doubles titles on tournaments of the ITF Women's Circuit.

Arefyeva began tennis at the age of six and was coached by Igor Dernovskyy. In 2005, she played her first professional match at a $10k tournament in Kyiv where she had received a wildcard.

In 2006, Tetyana played in Kyiv once more, this time advancing past the first round, before losing to Agnese Zucchini in three sets. She also played in Kharkiv and Volos. She qualified for Kharkiv and received a wildcard into Volos. She played in the qualifying draws of all the ITF events in Cairo. She fell in qualifying for all three of them but she won two doubles matches in Cairo.

Arefyeva played lots more tournaments on the ITF Circuit 2007, reaching a quarterfinal at Tampere in Finland. She finished the year ranked at 769. In doubles, Tetyana teamed with Elena Jirnova to reach the final at Gausdal in Norway.

In February 2008, she won her first ITF title at Melilla in Spain. She also reached finals in Astana and Athens but lost to Alice Moroni and Zarina Diyas, respectively. She also reached a final in Arezzo but lost in straight sets. She ended the year ranked 613 in singles and 727 in doubles.

In 2009, Arefyeva became 18 and began a series of successful results. In Portimão in Portugal, she reached the semifinals defeating Stéphanie Vongsouthi en route. She completed back-to-back finals at Antalya and Almaty. She lost in Turkey to Irini Georgatou but won in Almaty, defeating Daria Kuchmina. At a $25k event in Namangan, Uzbekistan, Tetyana reached the final by defeating Ksenia Palkina, Çağla Büyükakçay and Sofia Kvatsabaia. She was defeated in the final by Kristina Antoniychuk, 6–0, 6–1.

ITF Circuit finals

Singles: 7 (2 titles, 5 runner-ups)

Doubles: 9 (2 titles, 7 runner-ups)

References

External links
 
 

1991 births
Living people
Ukrainian female tennis players
Sportspeople from Kyiv